is a Japanese actress from Chiba Prefecture.

Filmography

Anime
2008
Michiko & Hatchin as Michiko (young) 
Porphy no Nagai Tabi as Rebecca (young)
xxxHolic: Kei as Kohane Tsuyuri

2009
A Certain Magical Index as Last Order
Kon'nichiwa Anne: Before Green Gables as Anne Shirley
Nogizaka Haruka no Himitsu: Purezza as Miu Fujinomiya

2010
A Certain Magical Index II as Last Order
Bakuman as Mina Azuki
Katanagatari as Konayuki Itezora
Ladies versus Butlers! as Mimina Ōsawa
Major (6th season) as Sunday
Mayoi Neko Overrun! as Honoka (ep 10)
Star Driver as Mizuno Yō
The Legend of the Legendary Heroes as Bueka
The World God Only Knows as Lime (ep 7)

2011
Dantalian no Shoka as Patricia Nash (ep 6)
Dream Eater Merry as Minato Kisaragi (ep 3)
Hoshi o Ou Kodomo as Mana
Ro-Kyu-Bu! as Airi Kashii
Sengoku Otome: Momoiro Paradox as Yoshino "Hideyoshi" Hide
Tiger & Bunny as Kaede Kaburagi

2012
Accel World as Yuniko Kozuki
Campione! as Shizuka Kusanagi
Inu x Boku SS as Ririchiyo Shirakiin
Moe Can Change! as Kanna Moegi
Nakaimo - My Sister Is Among Them! as Mei Sagara
Sword Art Online as Silica/Keiko Ayano
YuruYuri as Hanako Ōmuro
Waiting in the Summer as Rinon
Sword Art Offline as Silica/Keiko Ayano

2013
Arpeggio of Blue Steel ~Ars Nova~ as I-400
Bakuman. 3 as Mina Azuki
Galactic Armored Fleet Majestic Prince as Anna; Mayu
Galilei Donna as Hozuki Ferrari
Love Lab as Nana Ichikawa
Ro-Kyu-Bu! SS as Airi Kashii
Sasami-san@Ganbaranai as Tamamo-no-Mae
Servant x Service as Kanon Momoi
The Severing Crime Edge as Emily Redhands
Strike the Blood as Nagisa Akatsuki
Tamako Market as Anko Kitashirakawa
Sword Art Online: Extra Edition as Silica/Keiko Ayano

2014
Black Bullet as Enju Aihara
Captain Earth as Akari Yomatsuri
Girl Friend BETA as Nae Yuki
If Her Flag Breaks as Sakura
Sword Art Online II as Silica/Keiko Ayano

2015
Ultimate Otaku Teacher as Kanan Chinami 
To Love Ru Darkness 2nd as Nemesis
Food Wars: Shokugeki no Soma as Urara Kawashima
Kantai Collection as Mutsuki, Kisaragi, Mochizuki, Satsuki
Rin-ne as Hanako-san who appears in Friday the 13th
The Rolling Girls as Yukina Kosaka
Unlimited Fafnir as Iris Freyja
YuruYuri San Hai! as Hanako Ōmuro
Show by Rock!! as Rosia

2016
Aikatsu Stars! The Movie as Maori
And you thought there is never a girl online? as Ako Tamaki / Ako
Gate: Jieitai Kano Chi nite, Kaku Tatakaeri as Sherry Tyueri
Rilu Rilu Fairilu as Sumire
Magical Girl Raising Project as Hardgore Alice / Ako Hatoda
Accel World: Infinite Burst as Yuniko Kozuki/Scarlet Rain
Pokémon Generations as Iris
Show by Rock!! Short!! as Rosia
Show by Rock!! # as Rosia

2017
Schoolgirl Strikers as Satoka SumiharaSword Art Online The Movie: Ordinal Scale as Silica/Keiko AyanoArmed Girl's Machiavellism as Warabi HanasakaAngel's 3Piece! as Kurumi NukuiSenki Zesshō Symphogear AXZ as PrelatiDive!! as Miu NomuraClassroom of the Elite as Arisu SakayanagiMade in Abyss as MioTrinity Seven the Movie: The Eternal Library and the Alchemist Girl as Lilim

2018The Ryuo's Work Is Never Done! as Ai HinatsuruMärchen Mädchen as Lynne DavesMs. Vampire Who Lives in My Neighborhood as Sakuya KuraiA Certain Magical Index III as Last OrderBoarding School Juliet as Kochō WanSword Art Online: Alicization as Silica/Keiko AyanoMillion Arthur as Bethor (also 2019)

2019That Time I Got Reincarnated as a Slime as Milim NavaThe Rising of the Shield Hero as FiloHensuki: Are You Willing to Fall in Love with a Pervert, as Long as She's a Cutie? as Yuika KogaA Certain Scientific Accelerator as Last OrderKengan Ashura as Elena RobinsonHigh School Prodigies Have It Easy Even In Another World as Ringo ŌhoshiVal × Love as Mutsumi Saotome

2020A Certain Scientific Railgun T as Last OrderIsekai Quartet 2 as FiloKaguya-sama: Love Is War? as Kobachi OsaragiDate A Live Fragment: Date A Bullet as Panie IbusukiIs It Wrong to Try to Pick Up Girls in a Dungeon? III as WieneKuma Kuma Kuma Bear as Noire FoschurosePrincess Connect! Re:Dive as Mimi / Mimi AkaneWarlords of Sigrdrifa as Nono KazuuraWandering Witch: The Journey of Elaina as Odoko

2021Combatants Will Be Dispatched! as Flaming BelialCute Executive Officer as Najimu MujinaKomi Can't Communicate as Ren YamaiOtherside Picnic as KozakuraRumble Garanndoll as Hayate MakamiShaman King as Pirika UsuiShow by Rock!! Stars!! as RosiaThat Time I Got Reincarnated as a Slime Season 2 as Milim NavaTropical-Rouge! Pretty Cure as Laura/Cure La MerVivy: Fluorite Eye's Song as OpheliaVlad Love as Mai Vlad Transylvania

2022Aharen-san wa Hakarenai as Eru AharenBoruto: Naruto Next Generations as Osuka Kamakura Classroom of the Elite 2nd Season as Arisu SakayanagiKaguya-sama: Love Is War – Ultra Romantic as Kobachi OsaragiKomi Can't Communicate Season 2 as Ren YamaiLove After World Domination as Haru ArisugawaMiss Shachiku and the Little Baby Ghost as Yūrei-chanMy Stepmom's Daughter Is My Ex as Yume IridoPrincess Connect! Re:Dive Season 2 as Mimi / Mimi AkaneShikimori's Not Just a Cutie as HachimitsuThe Eminence in Shadow as Claire KagenouThe Rising of the Shield Hero 2 as FiloTokyo 24th Ward as Kozue Shirakaba

2023Chained Soldier as Naon YunoClassroom of the Elite 3rd Season as Arisu SakayanagiCute Executive Officer R as Najimu MujinaI Got a Cheat Skill in Another World and Became Unrivaled in the Real World, Too as YutyPole Princess!! as Sana MurafujiShangri-La Frontier as EmulTomo-chan Is a Girl! as Misuzu GundoKuma Kuma Kuma Bear Punch! as Noire Foschurose

Anime films
2021Tropical-Rouge! Pretty Cure the Movie: The Snow Princess and the Miraculous Ring! as Laura/Cure La MerSword Art Online Progressive: Aria of a Starless Night as Silica
2022Kaguya-sama: Love Is War – The First Kiss That Never Ends as Kobachi Osaragi

Video games
2012
 Borderlands 2 as Angel (Jennifer Greene)

2013
 Kantai Collection as Ryūjō, Mutsuki class
 Sword Art Online: Infinity Moment as Silica/Keiko Ayano
 Oboro Muramasa as Okoi

2014Dengeki Bunko: Fighting Climax as Enju Aihara, Last Order, Airi KashiiSword Art Online: Hollow Fragment as Silica/Keiko Ayano

2015Dengeki Bunko: Fighting Climax Ignition as Enju Aihara, Last Order, Airi Kashii, Ako TamakiSword Art Online: Lost Song as Silica/Keiko AyanoGranblue Fantasy as Yaia

2016Sword Art Online: Hollow Realization as Silica/Keiko AyanoMegadimension Neptunia VII as K-ShaGirl's Frontline as Ribeyrolles, ART556

2017Fire Emblem Heroes as VeronicaXenoblade Chronicles 2 as Ursula

2018Princess Connect Re:Dive as Mimi / Mimi AkaneMaster of Eternity as PurisLeague of Legends as Tristana

2019Azur Lane as KMS Z19 Hermann Künne, KMS Z20 Karl Glaster, KMS Z21 Wilhelm Heidkamp, USS Anchorage

2021Granblue Fantasy as CaturaAkashic Chronicle as LaylaThe Idolmaster: Starlit Season as AyaCookie Run: Kingdom as Strawberry Crepe Cookie
2022Blue Archive as Hinata WakabaGoddess of Victory: Nikke as Neon
2023Sword Art Online: Last Recollection as Silica
TBDHonkai: Star Rail'' as Clara

References

External links
Official agency profile 
Rina Hidaka at Hitoshi Doi's Seiyuu Database

1994 births
Living people
Japanese child actresses
Japanese video game actresses
Japanese voice actresses
Voice actresses from Chiba Prefecture